The Erenik or Ribnik is a river in Kosovo. Located in the west of the country, it measures -long, a right tributary to the White Drin.

The Erenik originates near the Albanian border, in the northern slopes of the Junik Mountains, a part of the Accursed Mountains, under the Gjeravica peak, the highest mountain in Kosovo. The river flows to the south and south-east, following the eastern edge of the Accursed Mountains, dividing them from the western region.

Before passing through Gjakova, there is a string of settlements: the villages of Berjah, Stubëll, Nivokaz, Popoc, Shishman, and Ponoshec, the small town of Junik and the village and mine of Babaj i Bokës. It receives many streams from the right, flowing down from the Accursed Mountains (most notably, Shlepica and Reqica), but the Erenik's major tributaries are from its western side (Trava and Lumbardhi i Lloqanit).

After Gjakova, the Erenik flows beside the villages of Raçë and Bishtazhin, soon emptying into the White Drin near the village and hill of Pogragja. The river formed an epigene gallery feature called Ura e Fshejtë in the hill. The river valley in this final section serves as a part of the route of the Peja-Gjakova-Prizren road.

It is not navigable.

See also 
Terzi Bridge

Notes

References

Bibliography 

 Mala Prosvetina Enciklopedija, Third edition (1985); Prosveta; 
 Jovan Đ. Marković (1990): Enciklopedijski geografski leksikon Jugoslavije; Svjetlost-Sarajevo; 

Rivers of Kosovo
Accursed Mountains